Ahmad Adel (born January 7, 1984) is an Egyptian footballer. He plays the right back position for El-Ittihad El-Iskandary (El Ittihad).

He is a talented young defender who transferred to Al Ahly in January 2007. He is known for fast performance. Adel was playing for Al Ahly until the age of 16, when his family traveled to live in Alexandria. As a result, he left Al Ahly for Al-Olympi and started playing for the first-team of Al-Olympi at the age of 17, before moving to Al Ahly in January 2007. He was proved highly proficient and returned again to his home in summer 2008 for El Ittihad

Honours 

With Al Ahly:

 Winner of African Super Cup 2007
 Winner of Egyptian League (2006–2007)
 Winner of Egyptian Soccer Cup 2007
 CAF Champions League Finalist 2007

References

1984 births
Living people
Egyptian footballers
Association football defenders
Olympic Club (Egypt) players
Al Ittihad Alexandria Club players
Al Ahly SC players
El Gouna FC players
Smouha SC players
Wadi Degla SC players
Ittihad El Shorta SC players